Królewo may refer to the following places:
Królewo, Masovian Voivodeship (east-central Poland)
Królewo, Pomeranian Voivodeship (north Poland)
Królewo, Warmian-Masurian Voivodeship (north Poland)
Królewo, West Pomeranian Voivodeship (north-west Poland)